Fortunato Vizcarrondo Y Rodón (1895-1977) was an Afro-Puerto Rican composer, professor, and poet. He is best known for his poem "¿Y Tu Abuela Donde Esta?".

Life and career

Early life 
Fortunato Vizcarrondo Y Rodón was born on March 13, 1895, in Carolina, Puerto Rico, the son of Fortunato Vizcarrondo Y Mongrand and Rosenda Asunción Rodón Y Quiñonez.

Personal life 
He married Generosa Martínez Pérez in 1918, gaining a step-daughter named Iluminada Díaz Y Martínez (1917). The marriage produced seven children:  

 Rosa A. (1919)
 Fortunato, III (1920)
 Elmer Americus (1921)
 Aurea Asunción (1922)
 Dolores (1926)
 Mildred (1928)
 Carmen Lydia (1940)

Death 
In the last years of Fortunato's life, he suffered from ill health. In December of 1977, he had a diabetic shock and slipped into a coma. He spent two weeks in the Old San Juan Hospital, where he died on November 18, 1977, at 82. Fortunato's body was interred in The Municipal Cemetery in Carolina.

Works 
 ¿Y Tu Abuela Donde Esta? (1942)
 Dinga y Mandinga (1976)

References 

1895 births
1977 deaths
People from Carolina, Puerto Rico